Driven Music Group was a record label founded by Korn guitarist Brian "Head" Welch, Mark Nawara and Greg Shanaberger. The company has a distribution deal with Warner Music Group.

Current artists
Driven Madness
Flotsam & Jetsam
Godhead
Even The Dogs
Embracing Goodbye

Former artists
Crossbreed
Brian Head Welch

See also
 List of record labels

External links
Driven Music Group − official website
Driven Music Store − official store
Brian Head Welch − Head's official website
Brian Head Welch at Myspace

References

American record labels